Ray Goodlett is a retired American soccer defender who spent one season in Major League Soccer with D.C. United.

Goodlett graduated from Sherwood High School.  He attended Howard University, playing on the men’s soccer team from 1994 to 1997.  On April 12, 1999, Goodlett signed with the Hershey Wildcats of the USL A-League.  On July 25, 1999, he went on loan to D.C. United of Major League Soccer, but was an unused substitute.  In 2000, Goodlett began the season with the Wildcats, but D.C. United signed him on July 12, 2000.  He played four games that season.  United waived Goodlett on May 4, 2001.  On May 18, 2001, the Richmond Kickers signed Goodlett.  Following the 2003 season, Goodlett retired in order to attend Fuller Theological Seminary.  He graduated in June 2004 and became the Director of Every Nation Campus Ministries at the University of Richmond.  This led to his return to the Kickers, now playing in the USL Second Division, on March 21, 2006 for a single season. He is now a pastor at Redemption Hill Church. His wife, Heather, is the executive director of the Darrell Green Youth Life Foundation of Richmond.

He is a cousin of Gregory Simmonds.

References

External links
 

Living people
1977 births
American soccer players
D.C. United players
Hershey Wildcats players
Howard Bison men's soccer players
Major League Soccer players
Richmond Kickers players
A-League (1995–2004) players
USL Second Division players
People from Olney, Maryland
Association football defenders